"Invective Against Swans" is a poem by Wallace Stevens from his first book of poetry, Harmonium (1923).

Analysis

Stevens's ironic mode 
It has been observed that Stevens has two modes. The first mode is a pure
and orgiastic—Dionysian—celebration of life while the second is that of the
malign and ironic observer. "Invective against Swans" can be classified as belonging
to the latter.
David Herd plausibly
locates the insult at an abstract level. 
One of the tasks
Modernist poets set themselves, probably the chief task,
was to resuscitate the all but clapped-out diction of
English-language poetry. It was for this reason Wallace Stevens wrote
his "Invective Against Swans"....Stevens wanted people to understand
that the language of poetry (as it was passed down to him by his
Victorian predecessors), with its over-dependence on swans and clouds,
was all but obsolete, capable only of expressing a certain poetical
mood—a mood of burdened over-sensitivity.
Arguably then, the poem is
insulting not swans and clouds but rather both worn-out Victorian
diction and the philosophical/poetic impulse to escape nature, the latter through that decrepit vehicle of the soul which figures in
Platonic and Christian conceptions of immortality and a transcendent
world. There is no reason to think that Stevens was comfortable in
any such vehicle. In 1902 the 22-year-old Stevens enters in his
journal, "An old argument with me is that the true religious force in
the world is not the church but the world itself." In Adagia he writes,
"After one has abandoned a belief in god, poetry is that essence which takes
its place as life's redemption." See also "A High-Toned Old Christian Woman".

Re-imagining the natural world 
The poem may be saying that the poet should re-imagine the natural world,
neither escaping to Plato's world of Forms or the Christian heaven, nor
relying on Victorian imagination.
"Invective against Swans" perhaps "shows" how to do that re-imagining.
Its allusion
to Paphos, the mythical birthplace of Aphrodite—embodiment of the
values of love, sex, and beauty—doesn't bespeak an attitude that
exults in slipping "the surly bonds of Earth." Instead it expresses
summer's end in a pungently non-Victorian way.

Publication history
"Invective Against Swans" was first published in Harmonium, prior to 1923 and is therefore in the public domain.

Notes

References
Frank Kermode and Joan Richardson (editors), Stevens: Collected Poetry and Prose. 1997: Library of America.

1921 poems
American poems
Poetry by Wallace Stevens